The Rocker is a 2008 American comedy film directed by Peter Cattaneo and written by Maya Forbes and Wallace Wolodarsky, from a story by Ryan Jaffe. The film stars Rainn Wilson as a failed musician who goes on tour with his nephew's band after one of their songs goes viral. Christina Applegate, Jeff Garlin, Josh Gad, Teddy Geiger and Emma Stone also star. It was released on August 20, 2008, received mixed reviews and was a box office bomb, grossing just $8 million against its $15 million budget.

Plot
In 1986, Vesuvius, a rock band from Cleveland, Ohio, performs at a local theater. After the show, their manager informs them that a record company is interested in signing them, but only if they replace drummer Robert "Fish" Fishman with the nephew of the record company's president. At first the band refuses, as they have been together since high school and agree that Fish is the heart and soul of their band, but when their manager tells them they would get to tour as the opening act for Whitesnake, the band relents and drives away in their van, without Fish.

Twenty years later, Vesuvius remains an immensely successful band, while Fish is living a normal life. Matt Gadman, Fish's high school-aged nephew, plays keyboards in an alternative rock band called A.D.D., along with his friends Curtis Powell and Amelia Stone. The band is scheduled to play their school's prom but the gig is in jeopardy when their drummer gets suspended from school. Matt convinces the others to allow Fish to fill in.  The concert goes well at first, as Fish is still a natural talent on drums (in spite of not playing in 20 years), but he ruins the gig when he gets carried away and launches into an impromptu drum solo during a ballad. However, Fish is so excited by Curtis' songs and the chance to play again, he convinces them to let him join the band if he can deliver another gig. After repeated failed attempts, he finally succeeds in securing a gig at a club in Fort Wayne, Indiana. Because the other members are all minors, they have to sneak out to the gig but are apprehended in the process, as Fish borrowed his sister's minivan without permission, which she reported as stolen. Fish is forced to leave and rents the basement of a Chinese restaurant.

The band invents a new way to practice via four-way iChat. To the dismay of his bandmates, Fish performs in the nude due to the heat of his new residence. The video of the practice quickly goes viral under the title of the "naked drummer band". The band is signed to a recording contract by the same label as Vesuvius, and are sent on a midwest tour. However, Fish commits stereotypical acts, despite the physical costs on his body, and he vandalizes a hotel room, causing the band to be apprehended again.

After securing A.D.D.'s release, Kim, Curtis' mother, promises the other parents she will stay for the remainder of the tour, so their kids won't be influenced by Fish's antics.

The label asks A.D.D. to open a show for Vesuvius honoring their induction into the Rock and Roll Hall of Fame. Fish refuses to play the gig and Kim kisses him in a failed attempt to convince him to let go of his anger and finally move on. David sees the kiss and exaggerates the details of the ordeal to Curtis. At a later gig, Curtis announces they would be playing the show, angering Fish and driving him to leave the band. When the new drummer from the label proves to be lazy, Curtis eventually apologizes to Fish and convinces him to put aside his resentment and play the show. After meeting Vesuvius before the show to discover they have become vain and arrogant while sporting fake British accents (except for the drummer, who is actually English), Fish decides to forgive Vesuvius and wishes them good luck. Fish and the band perform to a standing ovation. After their gig, Amelia and Curtis, as well as Fish and Kim both begin a relationship. During Vesuvius' set, the lead singer's microphone falls off the stand while the voice track of their song continues revealing that they have been lip-syncing. Vesuvius' recording malfunctions, revealing their lip-synching to the audience, who boos them off the stage and their Hall of Fame membership is rescinded. The audience chants an encore for A.D.D., who fire David and perform for the crowd once again.

Cast

 Rainn Wilson as Robert “Fish” Fishman
 Christina Applegate as Kim Powell
 Josh Gad as Matt Gadman
 Teddy Geiger as Curtis Powell
 Emma Stone as Amelia Stone
 Jason Sudeikis as David Marshall
 Jane Lynch as Lisa Gadman
 Jeff Garlin as Stan Gadman
 Will Arnett as Lex Drennan
 Fred Armisen as Wayne Kerr
 Howard Hesseman as Nev Gator
 Lonny Ross as Timmy Sticks
 Bradley Cooper as Trash Grice
 Jon Glaser as Billy Ault
 Demetri Martin as Kip
 Aziz Ansari as Aziz
 Nicole Arbour as Trashy Groupy
 Pete Best as The Guy at the Bus Stop
 Jane Krakowski as Carol
 Samantha Weinstein as Violet
 Jonathan Malen as Jeremy
 Laura de Carteret as Amelia's Mom

Production

The Rocker was mostly filmed in Toronto, Ontario, Canada, with some exterior shots filmed in Cleveland, Ohio from July to September 2007.

The songs attributed to the band A.D.D. were mostly written and produced by musician/producer Chad Fischer, of the band Lazlo Bane. Fischer also performed most of the music, with Teddy Geiger singing the lead vocals. The songs attributed to the band Vesuvius were written and performed by the members of Lazlo Bane, with lead vocals sung by Keith England.

Promotion
To promote the movie, the song "Promised Land", as performed by the fictional band Vesuvius, was released as free downloadable content for the video game Rock Band, which is shown being played in the movie.

A viral marketing effort for the film was begun on August 11, 2008, when Rainn Wilson posted a message to the MySpace blog of Jenna Fischer, his co-star from The Office.  According to his message, he had "kidnapped the lovely Jenna, put her, bound, in the trunk of my Firebird and logged onto her MySpace to send out this bulletin....To free America's sweetheart...you must attend my new movie, 'The Rocker', which opens August 20th....As soon as the film grosses 18.7 Mil, she will be released and given a peach smoothie." In the end the film was not even close to grossing that much money. A subsequent blog entry pointed readers to freejennanow.com, where videos were posted and features such as a "Free Jenna Game" and countdown tickers could be found.

'The Rocker: Live The Dream' was a competition to promote the film via MySpace and Kerrang! magazine in the UK. Over 1200 bands entered original songs at therockeruk for a chance to win a photo shoot and interview with Kerrang! magazine, a trip to the MySpace Black Curtain Screening in London, Gibson musical equipment and an assortment of 20th Century Fox merchandise. Ten bands went through to the final judging and Scottish band Alburn were chosen by Kerrang! editor Paul Brannigan, as the winner. Alburn dressed and posed as characters from the film in the Kerrang! photo shoot. Rainn Wilson recorded a video message for the winning band, which was played at the MySpace Black Curtain Screening.

A Flash game titled The Rocker: TV Toss was also released. In the game, the player controls Fish (in 1st person view). The objective is to do damage to the hotel room by tossing TVs at various objects. The high score is calculated by means of the cost of objects damaged.

Reception

Critical response
On Rotten Tomatoes, the film holds an approval rating of 41% based on 123 reviews, with an average rating of 5.2/10. The site's critics consensus reads: "With a predictable and lightweight story, the earnest efforts of the cast are squandered by The Rockers bland script." On Metacritic, the film has a weighted average score of 53 out of 100, based on 28 critics, indicating "mixed or average reviews". Audiences polled by CinemaScore gave the film an average grade of "B+" on an A+ to F scale.

Box office
The Rocker was released on August 20, 2008 in the USA. It was a bomb at the worldwide box office, opening outside the Top 10 at #12 with $2.64 million for its first weekend, grossing less than $7 million overall during its entire theatrical run. One of the stars of the film, Emma Stone, had another film (The House Bunny) open the same weekend. It fared much better than The Rocker, opening at #2.

References

External links
 
 

2008 films
2008 comedy films
2000s musical comedy films
20th Century Fox films
21 Laps Entertainment films
American musical comedy films
American rock music films
Dune Entertainment films
Films about percussion and percussionists
Films directed by Peter Cattaneo
Films scored by Chad Fischer
Films set in 1986
Films set in 2006
Films set in Cleveland
Films shot in Cleveland
Films shot in Toronto
2000s English-language films
2000s American films